The siege of Narva, also known as the Second Battle of Narva, was the second Russian siege of Swedish Narva during the Great Northern War from 27 June to 9 August 1704.

The siege came four years after the first battle of Narva, where the Russians were defeated by a much smaller Swedish force defending the city. Tsar Peter I marched to the area again with a reorganized army in an attempt to capture Narva and occupy Swedish Ingria, previously a Swedish logistical center and territory ceded by Russia in 1617. Marshal Boris Sheremetev's force of 20,000 captured Tartu on 24 June and then Russian forces led by Georg Benedict von Ogilvy besieged Narva, with the garrison under the Commandant Major-General Henning Rudolf Horn af Ranzien and consisting of only 3,800 infantry and 1,300 cavalry. After a long siege followed by a three-fronted attack, the Russians captured Narva on 20 August 1704, massacring hundreds of its Swedish garrison and inhabitants before Peter I stopped them. General Horn, several officers and many Swedish soldiers were captured, after roughly 3,200 casualties in the siege and aftermath. The Russians lost up to 3,000 men in total, with some estimates being over 10,000.

In August, Peter I signed the Treaty of Narva in the town, aligning the Sandomierz Confederation faction of the Polish–Lithuanian Commonwealth with Russia against Sweden in the war.

On 11 September, the surviving citizens of Narva swore allegiance to Peter I in the courtyard of the town hall, and the city was incorporated into the Russian Tsardom.

See also
 Lovisa von Burghausen
 Brigitta Scherzenfeldt
 Anna Ivanovna Kramer

References

External links
 Names of the Russian Generals, who command at the siege of Narva, 1704, and specification of the regiments employed (in Russian)

Narva (1704)
Conflicts in 1704
1704 in Europe
History of Narva
Battles in Estonia
Sieges involving Russia
Narva (1704)
Russia–Sweden military relations
18th century in Estonia